Chordifex microdon  is a rush species of the genus Chordifex in the family Restionaceae, native to Western Australia.

It was first described by Lawrie Johnson and Barbara Briggs in 2004. There are no synonyms.

References 

Restionaceae
Taxa named by Barbara G. Briggs
Plants described in 2004
Taxa named by Lawrence Alexander Sidney Johnson